North of Ireland Football Club  is a former Irish rugby union club that was based in Belfast, Northern Ireland. It was the first rugby club formed in what is now Northern Ireland and only two other clubs - Dublin University and Wanderers - were formed earlier anywhere else in all Ireland. It was founded in 1868 by members of North of Ireland Cricket Club. NIFC also played in the first recorded rugby game in Ulster when they played a 20-a-side match against Queen's University RFC.

Throughout its history, NIFC was one of the most successful clubs in Ulster rugby, winning eighteen Ulster Senior League titles and eighteen Ulster Senior Cup titles. They also played several seasons in the AIB League before merging with Collegians in 1999 to form Belfast Harlequins.

The club left its historic home on the Ormeau Road (one of the earliest international rugby venues in Ireland) after a series of sectarian arson attacks, including the burning of its pavilion. The club, with a mainly Protestant membership, was perceived as being "isolated in a zone of working-class nationalism".

Notable players
 
See also

Ireland
The following NIFC players represented Ireland at full international level.

British and Irish Lions
The following NIFC players also represented the British and Irish Lions.

Ireland cricket team
The following NIFC players also represented Ireland at cricket. 
 
 Robert Alexander
 Neil Doak

Honours

All-Ireland Cup: 1
1934-35
Ulster Senior Cup: 18
 1884–85, 1892–93, 1893–94, 1894–95, 1895–96, 1896–97, 1897–98, 1898–99, 1900–01, 1901–02, 1907–08, 1919–20, 1929–30, 1934–35, 1938–39, 1954–55, 1968–69, 1972–73
Ulster Senior League: 18 (1 shared)
 1891–92, 1892–93, 1893–94, 1894–95, 1895–96, 1896–97, 1897–98, 1898–99, 1900–01, 1901–02, 1908–09, 1920–21, 1926-27 (shared), 1945–46, 1954–55, 1958–59, 1965–66, 1991–92
Ulster Junior Cup: 9
 †1894-95, †1906-07, †1907-08, †1908-09, †1935-36, †1953-54, †1956-57, †1962-63, †1984-85

† Won by 2nd XV

References

Rugby clubs established in 1868
Irish rugby union teams
Rugby union clubs in Northern Ireland
Belfast Harlequins
Rugby union clubs in County Antrim
1868 establishments in Ireland